Frederick Joseph Monkhouse (10 June 1871 – 18 September 1946) was an Australian rules footballer who played with South Melbourne in the Victorian Football League (VFL).

Notes

External links 

1871 births
1946 deaths
Australian rules footballers from Victoria (Australia)
Sydney Swans players